The 2013–14 NBL Canada season was the third season of the National Basketball League of Canada. The regular season began on November 1, 2013. The regular season ended on Friday, February 28, 2014, and the playoffs began on Sunday, March 2, 2014 and ended on Thursday, April 17, 2014 with the Windsor Express defeating the Island Storm in seven games to win the 2014 NBLC Finals.

Offseason

Following the conclusion of the 2012-13 NBL Canada season, the Oshawa Power relocated to Mississauga, Ontario, and were renamed the Mississauga Power. The 2013–14 NBL Canada season also featured expansion to two new locations: Ottawa, and Brampton. 
During preseason, another team announced its relocation, the Summerside Storm moving to Charlottetown, PEI. It was announced that the Storm name would be retained. In early August, the league's board of governors announced the Jazz would sit out the season due to failure of securing new ownership from the league.

Coaching changes

Offseason
On August 6, 2013, the Halifax Rainmen hired Chris Terrell as head coach.

On August 12, 2013, the St. John Mill Rats hired Rob Spon as head coach.

On August 16, 2013, the Mississauga Power hired Fred Grannum as head coach.

Draft

The 2013 NBL Canada draft took place on August 19 at the Hilton Suites Conference Centre & Spa in Markham, Ontario. The Ottawa SkyHawks made league history by drafting Alex Johnson of NC State, the first Canadian to ever be drafted with the first pick in the NBLC draft.

Regular season
The regular season began on November 1, 2013, and concluded on February 28, 2014. The number of games played by each team remains 40, similar to the prior season.

Standings

|}

|}

Statistics leaders

Individual statistic leaders

Individual game highs

Team statistic leaders

Awards

Players of the week
The following players were named the NBL Canada Players of the Week.

Coach of the month
The following coaches were named the NBL Canada Coaches of the Month.

Playoffs
 
The NBL Canada Championship Playoffs format has changed after the 2013 expansion. Initially, the first 4 teams out of 5 in each division would qualify. After the Jazz withdrawal from the season, this posed the problem of having all 4 teams in the Atlantic Division be already qualified. Although nothing has been announced officially by the league, some newspapers wrote that indeed all 4 teams in Atlantic will qualify, as well as the first 3 teams in Central. Teams 4 and 5 in the Central Division will play a wild card game for playoff access.

* Division winner
Bold Series winner

Wild card series 
(4) Ottawa SkyHawks vs. (5) Mississauga Power

Notable occurrences
 After being unable to find new ownership, the NBLC announced the Montreal Jazz would sit out the 2013–14 season.
The Oshawa Power officially moved to Mississauga and were renamed the Mississauga Power.
The Summerside Storm officially moved to Charlottetown and were renamed the Island Storm.
The NBLC officially announced that expansion for the 2014–15 season will be open to ownership groups from Canada's Western Provinces.
The NBLC officially named Paul Riley as league commissioner.
After a disappointing 2–4 start to the 2013–14 season, the Mississauga Power released head coach Fred Grannum. The Power promoted long time assistant coach David Joseph to head coach.
The November 21 game between the Halifax Rainmen and the Moncton Miracles was canceled at halftime due to a citywide power outage in Moncton. The second half of the game will be finished on January 2.
The November 24 game between the Ottawa SkyHawks and the London Lightning was canceled due to inclement weather in London. The game is rescheduled for January 22.
The Ottawa SkyHawks relieved head coach Kevin Keathley of his duties on November 25 after a 4–3 start to the season. Jaren Jackson, a former NBA champion with the San Antonio Spurs, was named as the new head coach.
The Halifax Rainmen relieved Chris Terrell of his head coaching duties on November 26 after a disappointing 0–6 start to the season. The Rainmen named former NBA star Craig Hodges as interim head coach.
The December 10 game between the Island Storm and the Moncton Miracles was canceled due to inclement weather. The game was rescheduled to February 15.
The December 15 games between the Island Storm against the Windsor Express, and the Saint John Mill Rats against the Moncton Miracles were postponed due to inclement weather. The Storm/Express game was played on December 16, while the Mill Rats/Miracles game is rescheduled for February 26.
The December 21 game between the Brampton A's and the Halifax Rainmen was postponed due to inclement weather. The game was played on December 23.
The December 23rd game between the Brampton A's and the London Lightning was rescheduled to allow the Halifax Rainmen play in their place, the game to London Lightning was rescheduled to Feb 2014.
The December 22 game between the Saint John Mill Rats and the Moncton Miracles was postponed due to inclement weather. The game will be rescheduled to a future date in February.
The January 15 regular season game between the Windsor Express and their Central Division rivals London Lightning was held at the Coliseum on the grounds of the Caesars Windsor, dubbed the "Clash at the Coliseum". The Express won the game 86–78.
The January 25 game between the Windsor Express and the Brampton A's was postponed due to inclement weather. The game will be rescheduled to a future date.
In an effort to expand their fanbase, the Ottawa SkyHawks played their January 27 game with the London Lightning on the campus of Cégep de l'Outaouais, the biggest public college in the Outaouais region of Quebec, Canada. The SkyHawks played a second game their against the Windsor Express on February 24.
The January 29 game between the Moncton Miracles and the Halifax Rainmen was postponed due to inclement weather. The game will be rescheduled to a future date.
The January 31 games between the Windsor Express versus the Brampton A's and the Halifax Rainmen versus the Moncton Miracles were postponed due to inclement weather. The Rainmen/Miracles game is rescheduled for February 24 and the Express/A's game is rescheduled for February 25.
The Windsor Express set a new NBL Canada league record of 12 straight wins with their February 15 win against the Brampton A's.
The February 16 game between the Halifax Rainmen and the Island Storm was postponed due to inclement weather. The game is rescheduled for February 26.

References

External links
 

 
National Basketball League of Canada seasons
NBL